Charlestown is a small hamlet, making up one of the settlements which are collectively called Gairloch, and located directly south of the main village of Gairloch, and overlookling the harbour area, on the west of Ross-shire, Scottish Highlands and is in the Scottish council area of Highland.

References

Populated places in Ross and Cromarty
Gairloch